Face of Love, Faces of Love, The Face of Love, etc., may refer to:

Books
Faces of Love: Hafez and the Poets of Shiraz, 2012 collection of poetry by Hafez

Film and television
The Faces of Love (film), a 1924 Italian silent film
The Face of Love, a 1954 BBC TV movie adapted from Troilus and Cressida
Faces of Love (1977 film), a French drama film
Faces of Love (2007 film), a Filipino film
The Face of Love (2013 film), a 2013 American film
The Face of Love (1954 film), a 1954 BBC TV film
Faces of Love Film Festival, Russian film festival

Music
The Face of Love (album), a 2006 album by Sanctus Real, or its title track
Faces of Love (EP), a 2018 extended play by Bae Suzy
The Faces of Love - The Songs of Jake Heggie, a 1999 album by Jake Heggie
"Face of Love", a song by Miranda Cosgrove from the 2011 extended play High Maintenance
"Face of Love", a song by Jewel from the 1999 release Joy: A Holiday Collection